Come Out may refer to:

Come Out (Reich), a music piece by Steve Reich 
Coming out, disclosing one's sexual orientation or gender identity
"Come Out", a song by Camper van Beethoven from New Roman Times
Come Out Festival, an arts festival in Adelaide, South Australia

See also
Come Out Come Out, a 1995 album by Cub
Coming out (disambiguation)